Death toll is the number of dead as a result of a war, disaster, or other event. 

It may also refer to:

 Death Toll, 2008 action film
 High-Ballin', 1978 action comedy film also released as Death Toll

See also 
 List of lists organized by death toll